STOS may refer to:

 STOS BASIC, a programming language for the Atari ST computer
 stos, an opcode mnemonic in X86 assembly language
 Secure Trusted Operating System Consortium
 Štós, a village in Slovakia

See also
 ST:TOS, an abbreviation for Star Trek: The Original Series (ST:OS)
 STO (disambiguation) for the singular of STOs